No Thanks, Coffee Makes Me Nervous is a 1982 Italian giallo-comedy film directed by Lodovico Gasparini.

Plot
The first New Naples Festival is troubled by some unexplained events and by the menaces of a serial killer named Funiculì Funiculà. Two journalists, the shy Michele and the enterprising Lisa Sole, investigate.

Cast
Lello Arena: Michele Giuffrida
Maddalena Crippa: Lisa Sole
Massimo Troisi: Himself
Armando Marra: Dieci Decimi
Anna Campori: Miss Rosa
James Senese: Himself
Carlo Monni: Inspector Barra
Sergio Solli: Mitomane

See also       
 List of Italian films of 1982

References

External links
 
 No Thanks, Coffee Makes Me Nervous at Variety Distribution

1982 films
Italian crime comedy films
1980s Italian-language films
1980s crime comedy films
Giallo films
Films set in Naples
1982 comedy films
Films directed by Lodovico Gasparini
1980s Italian films